Chibuzor Nelson Azubuike (born 9 October 1986), known professionally as Phyno, is a Nigerian rapper, singer, songwriter and record producer. A native of Anambra State, Phyno was born and raised in Enugu State. He started his music career as a producer in 2003, and is renowned for rapping in the Igbo language. His debut studio album No Guts No Glory was released in 2014. It was supported by the singles "Ghost Mode", "Man of the Year", "Parcel" and "O Set". Phyno has worked with artists such as Olamide, Wizkid, Davido, Timaya, Flavour, Ruggedman, Bracket, J. Martins and Mr Raw.

Life and music career 
A native of Anambra State, Chibuzor Nelson Azubuike was born and raised in Enugu State. His stage name, given to him by one of his secondary school friends, was derived from the word phenomenal. Phyno developed an interest in music production during his secondary school days. He initially wanted to become a pilot, but was told that he could be a doctor. Throughout secondary school, he learned to play the drums and piano. He also learned to create his own rendition of every recording he heard. He studied public administration at the Institute of Management and Technology in Enugu, and started profiting from music during his second year there. Phyno told Ifeoma Onoye that Mr Raw is one of the few people he looks up to. Phyno started rapping in 2010 and relocated to Lagos to further his music career.

Phyno started recording his debut studio album No Guts No Glory in 2012. The album features guest appearances from Stormrex, Omawumi, Olamide, Efa, P-Square, Timaya, Flavour N'abania, Mr Raw, M.I, Ice Prince and Runtown. It was primarily recorded in Igbo and Nigerian Pidgin. On 25 September 2012, he released the Olamide-assisted track "Ghost Mode" as the album's lead single. The song won Best Collabo at the 2012 The Headies Awards and 2013 Nigeria Entertainment Awards. The music video for "Ghost Mode" was released on 7 December 2012. It was shot and directed in Lagos by Clarence Peters. Sputnet Records released the album's second single "Man of the Year (Obago)" on 23 March 2013. The song won Best Rap Single at the 2013 Headies Awards.

In June 2013, Phyno performed for 25 minutes in Owerri as part of the Star Music Trek tour. He toured with D'banj, Burna Boy, Chidinma, Vector, Pucado, Seyi Shay, Show Dem Camp, Kay Switch and Sean Tizzle as a supporting act on the 2013 Hennessy Artistry Club Tour. The music video for "Man of the Year (Obago)" was uploaded to YouTube on 20 August 2013. It was also shot and directed by Clarence Peters in Abakpa Nike, and features a cameo appearance from Illbliss. In September 2013, the Nigerian Broadcasting Corporation banned the music video from being broadcast. The album's third single "Parcel" was released on 11 October 2013. It was originally titled "Parcel (a BIG Nwa)". 

The music video for "Parcel" was shot by Clarence Peters and released on 19 February 2014. "O Set" was released as the album's fourth single on 4 March 2014. The song was produced by WizzyPro and features vocals by P-Square. The music video for the song was directed by Jude Engees Okoye. On 22 May 2014, Phyno released the music video for "Alobam", which was directed by Clarence Peters. Produced by Major Bangz, the song is an Igbo slang for "My Guy". On 2 September 2014, Phyno released the video for his "Authe (Authentic)" song with Flavour. On 7 October 2014, he released the Major Bangz-produced track "Yayo". It debuted at number 8 on the Pulse Music Video charts. Phyno performed at the 2014 edition of the Star Music Trek tour in Nsukka, Enugu State. The Clarence Peters-directed music video for "Yayo" premiered on 5 January 2015. Opeoluwani Akintayo of The Daily Times of Nigeria gave the video an overall rating of 8 stars of 10, commending its use of props.

Phyno's collaborative album with Olamide, titled 2 Kings, was released on 1 April 2015. Both rappers announced plans for the album's release on social media. In March 2019, Phyno announced plans to release his third studio album Deal With It. The album was supported by the singles "Agu" and "The Bag". It features guest appearances from Olamide, Falz, Davido, Don Jazzy, Zoro, Runtown and Teni. In July 2021, Phyno released the single "Bia".

Artistry 
Phyno told the Nigerian Tribune he raps in Igbo because he respects his culture and loves being himself. Although he primarily raps in Igbo, he incorporates a bit of Nigerian Pidgin and English into his music. Phyno believes the elements of music makes it borderless.

Discography 
Studio albums
 No Guts No Glory (2014)
 The Playmaker (2016)
 Deal With It (2019)
 Something to Live For (2021)

Collaborative albums
 2 Kings (with Olamide) (2015)

Filmography

Awards and nominations 

MTV Africa Music Awards

!Ref
|-
|2015
|Himself
|Best Hip-hop
|
|

Channel O Music Video Awards

!Ref
|-
|2014
|"Alobam"
|Most Gifted Hip-hop
|
|

City People Entertainment Awards

!Ref
|-
|rowspan="2"|2014
|Himself
|Rap Artiste of the Year
|
|rowspan="2"|
|-
|No Guts No Glory
|Rap Album of the Year
|
|-
|rowspan="2"|2013
|"Ghost Mode" (featuring Olamide)
|Best Collabo of the Year
|
|rowspan="2"|
|-
|Himself
|Best Rap Artiste of the Year
|

Nigeria Entertainment Awards

!Ref
|-
|2014
|rowspan="2"|Himself
|Best Rap Act of the Year
|
|
|-
|rowspan="2"|2013
|Best Rap Act of the Year
|
|
|-
|"Ghost Mode" (featuring Olamide)
|Best Collabo
|
|

African Muzik Magazine Awards

!Ref
|-
|rowspan="2"|2013
|rowspan="2"|Himself
|Best Newcomer
|
|rowspan="2"|
|-
|Best Rap Act
|

Nigeria Music Video Awards (NMVA)

!Ref
|-
|2013
|"Man of the Year"
|Best Afro Hip Hop Video
|
|

The Headies

!Ref
|-
|rowspan="6"|2014
|Himself
|Artiste of the Year
|
|rowspan="6"|
|-
|Phyno for "Alobam"
|Best Street-Hop Artiste
|
|-
|rowspan="2"|No Guts No Glory
|Best Rap Album
|
|-
|Album of the Year
|
|-
|"Parcel"
|rowspan="2"|Best Rap Single
|
|-
|"Dope Money" (Olamide featuring Phyno)
|
|-
|rowspan="7"|2013
|rowspan="2"|Himself
|Next Rated
|
|rowspan="2"|
|-
|Lyricist on the Roll
|
|-
|"Ghost Mode" (featuring Olamide)
|rowspan="2"|Best Collabo
|
|
|-
|"Ezioku" (Lynxxx featuring Ikechukwu, Illbliss, and Phyno)
|
|
|-
|"Man of the Year"
|rowspan="3"|Best Rap Single
|
|
|-
|"Anam Achi Kwanu" (Illbliss featuring Phyno)
|
|rowspan="2"|
|-
|"Ghost Mode" (featuring Olamide)
|
|-
|rowspan="2"|2012
|"Shutdown"
|Best Rap Single
|
|rowspan="2"|
|-
|Phyno (for "Shutdown")
|Lyricist on the Roll
|

NET Honours

See also 
 List of Nigerian rappers
 List of Nigerian musicians

References 

Living people
Nigerian male rappers
Igbo rappers
Musicians from Enugu State
The Headies winners
Nigerian hip hop record producers
1986 births